The second season of the American television series Arrow premiered on The CW on October 9, 2013, and concluded on May 14, 2014, with a total of 23 episodes. The series is based on the DC Comics character Green Arrow, a costumed crime-fighter created by Mort Weisinger and George Papp, and is set in the Arrowverse, sharing continuity with other Arrowverse television series. The showrunners for this season were Greg Berlanti, Marc Guggenheim and Andrew Kreisberg. Stephen Amell stars as Oliver Queen, with principal cast members Katie Cassidy as Laurel Lance, David Ramsey as John Diggle, Willa Holland as Thea Queen, Susanna Thompson as Moira Queen, and Paul Blackthorne as Quentin Lance returning from the previous season. They are joined by Emily Bett Rickards as Felicity Smoak, Colton Haynes as Roy Harper and Manu Bennett as Slade Wilson, who were promoted to series regulars from their recurring status in the previous season.

The series follows billionaire playboy Oliver Queen (Stephen Amell), who claimed to have spent five years shipwrecked on Lian Yu, a mysterious island in the North China Sea, before returning home to Starling City (later renamed "Star City") to fight crime and corruption as a secret vigilante whose weapon of choice is a bow and arrow. In the second season, Oliver has vowed to stop crime without killing criminals, using "The Arrow" as his new name to represent that, and is aided with by allies, John and Felicity. Oliver's vow is tested when he comes under attack from Slade Wilson (Manu Bennett), a man from Oliver's time on the island who resurfaces with a vendetta against him. Oliver grows to accept aspiring vigilante Roy Harper as his protégé, and begins to receive assistance from Quentin. Oliver also gains another ally, Sara Lance (Caity Lotz), who survived her ordeal at sea six years prior. The season features flashbacks to Oliver's second year on Lian Yu, where he faces a new threat from Dr Anthony Ivo (Dylan Neal), whilst continuing to struggle to survive alongside allies Slade and Sara, and the archer Shado (Celina Jade). The origins of his feud with Slade is revealed.

The series was renewed for its second season on February 11, 2013. The second season received critical acclaim, and averaged 3.28 million viewers each week. The season would go on to be nominated for fifteen nominations in various categories. This season introduces characters from The Flash, which was being developed as a potential spin-off at the time. The season was released on DVD and Blu-ray on September 16, 2014. The series was renewed for a third season on February 12, 2014.

Episodes

This season was prefaced with a recap episode airing on October 2, 2013, titled "Year One". It featured highlights from season one and a special preview of the second season.

Cast and characters

Main
 Stephen Amell as Oliver Queen / Arrow
 Katie Cassidy as Laurel Lance
 David Ramsey as John Diggle
 Willa Holland as Thea Queen
 Emily Bett Rickards as Felicity Smoak
 Colton Haynes as Roy Harper
 Manu Bennett as Slade Wilson / Deathstroke
 Susanna Thompson as Moira Queen
 Paul Blackthorne as Quentin Lance

Recurring

Guest

Production

Development
On February 11, 2013, The CW renewed Arrow for a second season for the 2013–14 season.

A backdoor pilot for The Flash was originally going to be the twentieth episode, but due to the positive reception of Grant Gustin's appearance in the eighth and ninth episode, executives at The CW scrapped it in favor a traditional pilot so that it gives the developers more time to flesh out the character in addition to receiving an increase in the budget.

Casting
Emily Bett Rickards, Colton Haynes and Manu Bennett were all promoted to series regulars. Jacqueline MacInnes Wood, who originally played Sara Lance in the pilot, did not return and was replaced by Caity Lotz.

Costume
In the second half of the second season, Oliver replaces his "paint" mask with a domino mask, similar to one worn by the character in the comics. The change is addressed on-screen, with Kreisberg saying, "He doesn't just put on a mask. It's actually a big plot point in an episode, and there really is a story behind, not only the need for the mask but also who provides him with it." On adding the mask now, Kreisberg stated that, "Conceptually, it was something we wanted to do because Oliver himself is evolving as the Arrow—from vigilante to hero, sort of from Arrow to Green Arrow—and we wanted to see that progression in his costume as well. As Oliver is embracing being a hero, being a hero means stepping out of the dark and being more of a symbol, so he has to take steps to conceal his identity more." He added that it will "allow the Arrow to interact with people who don't know his identity in a much more organic way than having him constantly keep his head down."

Costume designer Maya Mani put together roughly 50 mask options for the producers. Kreisberg said, "What's so wonderful about the design that Maya came up with is that it really is very simple, and it feels as if it’s been part of his costume since the beginning...once we finally had this mask and put it on Stephen [Amell], even Stephen was like, 'This is the right one. In the episode "Three Ghosts", Oliver receives the mask from Barry Allen, who is able to create a mask that will help conceal his identity, while still being functional and allowing Oliver to see clearly.

Music

Release

Broadcast 
The season began airing in the United States on The CW on October 10, 2013, and completed its 23-episode run on May 14, 2014.

Home media 
Arrow: Season 2 was released as a 5-disc DVD set and as a 9-disc Blu-ray and DVD combo pack set on September 16, 2014 in the United States and September 15, 2014 in the United Kingdom. The DVD and Blu-ray box sets contain additional features, including making-of featurettes, deleted scenes, gag reel, and highlights from the Paley Fest.

Reception

Critical response
The second season received favorable reviews. Jeff Jensen of Entertainment Weekly gave the first half of the second season a rating of B+, saying, "Arrow possesses an intelligence that shines through its TV-budget production values, which aren't too shabby. The writing is adult and witty, the action is exciting, and Amell holds the center with well-cultivated ease." The A.V. Clubs Carrie Raisler gave the first half of the second season a rating of A−. She said, "Arrow [has] officially established itself as one of the most satisfying shows on television. The most satisfying thing of all is that it did so by respecting its characters... [Arrow respects] the character’s comic-book roots in its overarching plotlines, all while using the network-appropriate soap-opera stories to do the heavy character lifting."

Rotten Tomatoes reported a 95% approval rating based on 12 reviews, with an average rating of 8.15/10. The site's consensus reading: "The second season of Arrow boasts more fantastic action, as well as a widening cast of intriguing, richly written characters."

Ratings
The second season averaged 3.28 million viewers across the 23 episodes, ranking 128th among television show viewership.

Accolades

|-
! scope="row" rowspan="16" | 2014
| rowspan="2" | Constellation Awards
| Best Male Performance in a 2013 Science Fiction Television Episode
| data-sort-value="Amell, Stephen" | Stephen Amell ("The Odyssey")
| 
| 
|-
| Best Science Fiction Television Series of 2013
| data-sort-value="Arrow" | Arrow
| 
| 
|-
| rowspan="2" | IGN Awards
| Best TV Action Series
| data-sort-value="Arrow" | Arrow
| 
| 
|-
| Best TV Hero
| data-sort-value="Amell, Stephen" | Oliver Queen
| 
| 
|-
| rowspan="6" | Leo Awards
| Best Cinematography Dramatic Series
| data-sort-value="Verheul, Gordon" | Gordon Verheul ("Sacrifice")
| 
| 
|-
| Best Dramatic Series
| Greg Berlanti, Joseph P. Finn, Marc Guggenheim, Andrew Kreisberg, Wendy Mericle
| 
| 
|-
| Best Lead Performance by a Male Dramatic Series
| data-sort-value="Amell, Stephen" | Stephen Amell ("Crucible")
| 
| 
|-
| Best Lead Performance by a Female Dramatic Series
| data-sort-value="Rickards, Emily Bett" | Emily Bett Rickards ("Three Ghosts")
| 
| 
|-
| Best Make-Up Dramatic Series
| data-sort-value="Fowler, Danielle" | Danielle Fowler ("Keep Your Enemies Closer")
| 
| 
|-
| Best Stunt Coordination Dramatic Series
| data-sort-value="Makaro, J. J." | J. J. Makaro ("The Scientist")
| 
| 
|-
| People's Choice Awards
| Favorite Sci-Fi/Fantasy TV Actor
| data-sort-value="Amell, Stephen" | Stephen Amell
| 
| 
|-
| Satellite Awards
| Satellite Award for Best Television Series – Genre
| data-sort-value="Arrow" | Arrow
| 
| 
|-
| Saturn Awards
| Best Youth-Oriented Television Series
| data-sort-value="Arrow" | Arrow
| 
| 
|-
| rowspan="2" | Teen Choice Awards
| Choice Sci-Fi/Fantasy TV Show
| data-sort-value="Arrow" | Arrow
| 
| 
|-
| Choice TV Female Breakout Star
| data-sort-value="Rickards, Emily Bett" | Emily Bett Rickards
| 
| 
|-
| Young Hollywood Awards
| Super Superhero
| data-sort-value="Amell, Stephen" | Stephen Amell
| 
| 
|-
! scope="row" | 2015
| PRISM Awards
| Performance in a Drama Multi-Episode Storyline
| data-sort-value="Cassidy, Katie" | Katie Cassidy
| 
| 
|}

Notes

References

External links

 
 

Arrow (TV series) seasons
2013 American television seasons
2014 American television seasons
Television series set in 2006
Television series set in 2008
Television series set in 2009